Niwot Ridge is an alpine ecology research station located 65 km north-west of Denver in north-central Colorado. It is on the Front Range of the southern Rocky Mountains and lies within the Roosevelt National Forest.

Characteristics of the site

Niwot Ridge was designated a UNESCO Biosphere Reserve in 1979 and was one of 17 reserves in the United States withdrawn from the programme in June 2017. The Niwot Ridge Long-Term Ecological Research Site was established in 1980 as a United States Forest Service experimental ecology reserve.

The site is characterized by "extensive alpine tundra, a variety of glacial landforms, glacial lakes and moraines, cirques and talus slopes, patterned ground, and permafrost", and is home to Arikaree Glacier. Habitats include western spruce-fir forest,, lodgepole pine (Pinus contorta) subalpine forest, alpine meadows as well as ponderosa pine (Pinus ponderosa) shrubland. The site is little influenced by human impact and is thus an excellent site to monitor biological, chemical, and physical responses to changes in atmospheric chemistry and climate. The site is administered cooperatively by the U.S. Forest Service and the University of Colorado Boulder's Institute of Arctic and Alpine Research (INSTAAR) for experimental and long-term studies of alpine tundra.

The University of Colorado's Mountain Research Station facilitates research from atmospheric chemistry to alpine and sub-alpine ecology. Niwot Ridge is one of the National Science Foundation's Long Term Ecological Research Network (LTER) sites, and has been used by the National Oceanic and Atmospheric Administration (NOAA) for atmospheric trace gas sampling since 1968. The eddy covariance dataset at Niwot Ridge is among the longest for forest sites, and has been used to study the role of subalpine forests in cycles of water, carbon, nutrients, and energy.

Substantial increases in nitrogen deposition during the past three decades is one of the major concerns and has already impacted biological processes in alpine tundra and surrounding catchment areas. Educational programs in the biosphere reserve focus primarily on the university level, but also include high schools and the general public.

Sources

References

External links

 Neonscience site
 Another site

Former biosphere reserves of the United States
Research stations
Protected areas of Colorado